Events from the year 1840 in Russia

Incumbents
 Monarch – Nicholas I

Events

 
 
  
  
 
 
  

 Battle of the Valerik River
 Convention of London (1840)

Births

April 9 – Praskovya Uvarova, archaeologist (d. 1924)
May 7 – Pyotr Ilyich Tchaikovsky, composer (d. 1893)

Deaths

References

1840 in Russia
Years of the 19th century in the Russian Empire